Cyril John Freezer (19 February 1924 – 19 May 2009) was an English railway modeller, writer, and magazine editor. He edited Railway Modeller from 1950 to 1978, and Model Railways from 1978 until 1983. He also wrote many articles for Model Railroader. Freezer popularised the 'terminus to fiddle yard layout', is credited with inventing the "rabbit warren layout", and published many books on model railways, many of which are considered classics in the field.

Early life
Born in east London, Freezer was educated at Barking Abbey School. Training as an engineer in a dockyard on the Isle of Dogs and working for Associated Press, he started as editor of the Railway Modeller magazine. The first edition he was responsible for was August - September 1950.

He was a prolific designer of model railway layouts and published numerous books of track plans. Perhaps his most famous design was "Minories", a plan for a compact suburban terminus built on a folding baseboard. The layout was based loosely on the Metropolitan station at Liverpool Street and packed a great deal of operating potential into a modest layout that could easily be built by a relatively inexperienced modeller. Originally published in 1957, innumerable layouts have been built following its simple but elegant design.

In 2007 the Diesel and Electric Modellers United (DEMU) ran a small layout competition to celebrate the 50th anniversary of the plan's publication. The competition was to build and exhibit a layout based on the Minories trackplan and was judged by Cyril's son Nick. A number of exceptionally high quality layouts were entered including "Ripper Street", "Minories GN" and "Westonmouth Central". The winner was eventually chosen as "Birmingham Moor Street" by the Scalefour Society WMAG.

References 

  ISSN 0033-8931 July 2009 edition includes obituary on page 458.

External links
 Obituary, Financial Times (pay site)
carendt.com, tribute

Rail transport modellers
1924 births
2009 deaths
People educated at Barking Abbey Grammar School